Hermanubis is a Graeco-Egyptian god who conducts the souls of the dead to the underworld. He is a syncretism of Hermes from Greek mythology and Anubis from Egyptian mythology.

Description

Hermes' and Anubis's similar responsibilities (they were both conductors of souls) led to the god Hermanubis.  He was popular during the period of Roman domination over Egypt. Depicted having a human body and a jackal head, with the sacred caduceus that belonged to the Greek god Hermes, he represented the Egyptian priesthood. He engaged in the investigation of truth.

The divine name  is known from a handful of epigraphic and literary sources, mostly of the Roman period. Plutarch cites the name as a designation of Anubis in his underworldly aspect, while Porphyry refers to Hermanubis as  "composite" and  "half-Greek".

Although it was not common in traditional Greek religion to combine the names of two gods in this manner, the double determination of Hermanubis has some formal parallels in the earlier period. The most obvious is the god Hermaphroditus, attested from the fourth century BC onwards, but his name implies the paradoxical union of two different gods (Hermes and Aphrodite) rather than an assimilation in the manner of Hermanubis.

See also
 Ancient Egyptian religion
 Ancient Greek religion
 Egyptian pantheon
 Osiris-Dionysus
 Serapis

References

Bibliography 
 A history of Egypt Under Roman Rule by Joseph Grafton Milne (1992) p. 195
 Who's Who in Egyptian Mythology by Anthony S. Mercatante (2002) p. 56

External links
 Statue of Hermanubis (Alexandria, early 2nd century CE) , Antiquities Museum of Bibliotheca Alexandrina

Egyptian gods
Hellenistic Egyptian deities
Roman gods
Underworld gods
Anubis
Hermes
Psychopomps